Reggie Berg (born September 18, 1976) is an American former professional ice hockey player who played for the Florida Everblades of the ECHL. He was selected by the Toronto Maple Leafs in the 7th round (178th overall) of the 1996 NHL Entry Draft.

Career

Berg played juniors for two seasons with the Des Moines Buccaneers before spending four seasons at the University of Minnesota with their hockey team. He turned professional in the 1999-2000 season, spending most of the season with the Florida Everblades, playing two games for the Orlando Solar Bears in the IHL. The next two seasons, Berg split time between the Everblades, the IHL's Cincinnati Cyclones—a total of 3 games in the 2000-01 season—and the AHL's Lowell Lock Monsters. Berg did not play in 2002-03, and from the 2003-04 season through his retirement at the end of 2006-07, he played exclusively for the Everblades.

Statistics

Awards and honors

Berg holds the Florida Everblades franchise records for goals (145) and points (319). His jersey, number 10, is retired, with a banner hanging in the rafters of Hertz Arena.

External links
 
 

1976 births
American men's ice hockey centers
Cincinnati Cyclones (IHL) players
Florida Everblades players
Living people
Lowell Lock Monsters players
Orlando Solar Bears (IHL) players
Toronto Maple Leafs draft picks
Minnesota Golden Gophers men's ice hockey players
People from Coon Rapids, Minnesota